Borate sulfides are chemical mixed anion compounds that contain any kind of borate and sulfide ions. They are distinct from thioborates in which sulfur atoms replace oxygen in borates. There are also analogous borate selenides, with selenium ions instead of sulfur.

List

References

Borates
Sulfides
Mixed anion compounds